Benin participated at the 2018 Summer Youth Olympics in Buenos Aires, Argentina from 6 October to 18 October 2018.

Athletics

Girls

Swimming

Girls

Tennis

Boys

Mixed NOC

References

2018 in Beninese sport
Nations at the 2018 Summer Youth Olympics
Benin at the Youth Olympics